Tarabin may refer to:

Places
Tirabin al-Sana, a Bedouin village in Israel
Nuweiba, a resort in Sinai, Egypt

People
Tarabin bedouin
Dmitriy Tarabin, Russian athlete